{{Infobox person
| name        = Hazel Phillips
| honorific_suffix = 
| image       = 
| alt         = 
| caption     = 
| birth_name  = Hazel Julia Lovegrove
| birth_date  = 
| birth_place = Battersea, County of London, England
| death_date  = 
| death_place = 
| nationality = British / Australian
| other_names = 
| known_for   = Girl Talk
| notable_works  = {{bulleted|Beauty and the Beast|The Mavis Bramston Show|Girl Talk|Number 96|The Set}}
| years_active= 1956–present
| occupation  = 
}}
Hazel Julia Phillips  (born 17 November 1929)National Library of Australia record. is a British-Australian singer, actress and television talk show personality with a notable career in Australia. 

She is also a playwright, composer and lyricist who has written numerously for the stage, and compere of radio shows and a newspaper columnist and briefly operated a dinner cabaret restaurant.

Phillips worked as an interviewer in Hollywood, where she interviewed numerous such stars as  Bing Crosby, Paul Newman and Omar Shariff and Fess Parker.
  
Phillips has the distinction of apparently playing the world's first lesbian character on TV, on the serial Number 96, as Marie Crowther.<ref> Giles, Nigel "Number 96: Australia's Most Infamous Address</ref>

Phillips has appeared in numerous films including the Australian film The Set in 1970 and more recently in 2021, the Netflix film Love and Monsters, and  scheduled  in a Paramount film starring Sam Neill, and a TV commercial for Ford motors
 
She is often depicted as Australia's answer to Betty White in terms of career success and longevity.

Biography

Early life

Phillips was born as Hazel Lovegrove in Battersea (now Wandsworth), County of London (now south London). She has been singing and dancing since the age of three and in 1948 wonthe beauty pagent of Miss South England. At the age of 20, she became engaged to her husband Bill,a carpenter turned TV director and they emigrated to Australia as "Ten Pound Poms" in 1950–51, marrying shortly afterwards and having two children, Mark (born 1953) and Scott (born 1955). In 1961, at a time there where then  no seat belts in vehicles the family was involved in a serious car accident, and Phillips sustaining severe injuries to her chin. Her husband left them some time afterwards, with Phillips suggesting that the surgeries on her chin, her husband s affair with a dancer and an ectopic pregnancy contributed to the break-up of their marriage.

Early career

Phillips started her career at radio 2UE, having won a talent contest for Miss television in Australia. Active in television since its inception in Australia, she became one of the first personalities on Network Seven. in 1963, Phillips made her break into show business with a role on the talk show Beauty and the Beast opposite beast Eric Baume. She also began to appear on the satirical The Mavis Bramston Show, which she became a regular on after being told to choose between Bramston and Beauty and the Beast.

Gold Logie, television, film and theatre

She had left the seven network  and was hosting the midday talk show Girl Talk on the fledgling Network Ten, for which she won the Gold Logie Award for the most popular female personality on Australian television, jointly winning with Graham Kennedy who won the male award, she was the second female star locally in win that honour after entertainer Lorrae Desmond.       
 
Guest roles on numerous television shows including Number 96 (as a lesbian sharing a flat with Vera), Matlock Police, A Country Practice, G.P. and Pacific Drive, as well as mini-series Bride of Christ. 
 
Films include The Set (as a nude swimmer), Midnight Dancer, Walking Emily Home. and Monster Problems
 
Theatre roles starting from 1956 include The Circle, Henry V, Pride and Prejudice and The Merry Wives of Windsor
 
She also featured in a Marilyn Monroe Cabaret Show in 2002
 
In 2020, Phillips spoke to the Studio 10 program about gender pay gaps in the entertainment industry, stating female television hosts were paid less than their male counterparts, and that in the 1960s she had been paid less than one-tenth of the salaries paid to stars like Graham Kennedy and Don Lane.

Honours and awards

Autobiography
 
In 2008, her autobiography, Black River, Bright Star, was published by Zeus Publications.

Health 

Phillips is an activist for alternative medicine, she suffered a mild heart attack in 2009, and underwent a hip replacement

Australia’s Got Talent

Phillips in 2011, performed in the fifth series of Australia's Got Talent. and performed the Frank Sinatra song "You Make Me Feel So Young" and the Marilyn Monroe, song Diamonds Are a Girl's Best Friend. Phillips reached the semi-finals in the over-65 category, but was eliminated in the public vote. She still performs with her son's quartet as a vocalist.

Filmography

Film and television

Appearances

References

External links

1929 births
Living people
British television talk show hosts
English women singers
English stage actresses
English soap opera actresses
People from Wandsworth
English expatriates in Australia
Recipients of the Medal of the Order of Australia
Gold Logie winners
Australia's Got Talent contestants